River Glade is a Canadian rural community in Westmorland County, New Brunswick.  The Community centres on the Intersection of Route 106 and Sanitorium Road as well as Route 2.

Places of note
 Petty International Raceway
 Jordan LifeCare Centre - main employer in nearby community of The Glades.

History

Notable people

See also
List of communities in New Brunswick

References

Bordering communities
Wheaton Settlement, New Brunswick
Petitcodiac, New Brunswick
Kay Settlement, New Brunswick
Salisbury, New Brunswick

Communities in Westmorland County, New Brunswick